Jaime Zudáñez is a province in the Bolivian department of Chuquisaca. It was named after Jaime de Zudáñez, emancipation leader born in Chuquisaca in 1772.

Geography 
Some of the highest mountains of the province are listed below:

Subdivision
The province is divided into four municipalities which are further subdivided into cantons.

Places of interest
 El Palmar Integrated Management Natural Area

See also 
 Jatun Mayu
 Uritu Mayu

References 

Provinces of Chuquisaca Department